The Marion Jones Sports Complex, previously the National Stadium, is a multi-use stadium in Belize City, Belize.  It is used mostly for football matches, track and field and cycling.  The stadium holds 7,500.

It is named after former track athlete of Belizean descent, Marion Jones.

History
The National Stadium was established sometime in the 1960s as a venue for horse racing, football and cycling. The Cross Country Cycling Classic and other such events often finished with laps around the cycle track, originally sand and later asphalt.

A famous murder, that of Derek "Itza" Brown, took place on its grounds in 1992.

Eventually, the stadium was upgraded to its present condition, with planned expansion and conversion to a domed stadium expected. After her visit to Belize in 2001 at the height of her success following the Sydney Olympics, the stadium was named after Jones. Even with Jones' recent disgrace over steroid allegations there have been no plans to remove her name from the stadium.

Football venues in Belize City
Athletics (track and field) venues in Belize
Belize
Buildings and structures in Belize City